Thick and thin may refer to:

 "Thick and Thin", a song by Avenged Sevenfold on Sounding the Seventh Trumpet
 "Thick N' Thin", a song by The Black Crowes on Shake Your Money Maker
 "Thick & Thin", a song by Ten City on No House Big Enough
 Thick and thin, opposing philosophical concepts discussed by political theorist Michael Walzer
 Thick and thin, forms of the rule of law present in Chinese law

See also
 Through Thick and Thin, a 1927 film starring William Fairbanks and Jack Curtis